Petaling Jaya Rangers Football Club or PJ Rangers is a professional football club based in Petaling Jaya, Selangor. Founded in 2011, the club's home ground has been in multiple different stadiums before moving to AirAsia Stadium in Petaling Jaya.

In 2018, they played in the third division in Malaysian football, the Malaysia FAM League after being promoted as top four from Selangor Super League in 2014.

The club was formerly known as AirAsia Allstars before being rebranded in December 2016 to Petaling Jaya Rangers F.C. which was used from the 2017 season onwards.

The initial uses the nickname Red Jets, which signify the club's connection with the AirAsia Group. However, after the rebranding of the club name they were known as Rangers.

PJ Rangers regular kit colours are red and white for shirts, shorts and socks. The club's crest was rebranded along with the team name for the 2017 season.

History

Origins
Petaling Jaya Rangers Football Club was formed on 9 August 2011 as its former name AirAsia Allstars Football Club and the team competed in the Selangor state league. According to AirAsia Allstars FC founder Datuk Kamarudin Meranun the initial purpose of the club was to "encourage AirAsia’s staff to excel in sports – football in particular – besides being committed to their daily work in keeping AirAsia as the best low cost airline in the world." The club won the league and were promoted to play in the national league, Malaysia FAM League.

Promotion to Malaysia FAM League
The club was promoted to the Malaysia FAM League for the 2015 season after moving up from Selangor Super League. For their first season in the national league, the club appointed Mohd Nidzam Jamil as the new head coach. The club ended its first season in the national league in 7th place. After the first four matches of the 2016 season, the club replaced Nidzam Jamil with P. Maniam for the remainder of the season. The club managed to reach the playoff for the Malaysia Premier League after finishing the season in 3rd place although did not manage to be promoted.

Rebranded as Petaling Jaya Rangers
In November 2016, the club has announced the appointment of Mat Zan Mat Aris as the new head coach with a contract of two years as the club prepared for the new season. Mat Zan Mat Aris was the former head coach of Melaka United who achieved a back-to-back promotion from the third division to the top division. This was the sort of quality which Petaling Jaya Rangers were looking for.

As part of the club vision moving forwards, the club unveiled plans for the 2017 season with a rebranding from AirAsia F.C. to Petaling Jaya Rangers F.C. in order to bring more fans and promote local community support. The club also revealed its plans for 2017 with the focus on engaging communities. The club aimed to actively engage with and serve football fans in the area.

In an effort to support football development in Malaysia and in the region, Petaling Jaya Rangers announced an exclusive partnership with Queens Park Rangers (QPR) to start a football academy. The academy aimed to nurture and train the next generation of renowned footballers to play in the top flight of Malaysian football. Working together with the team, QPR will lent their expertise in training the players, local coaches and staff. The club has also trained a professional groundsmen and stadium marshals too.

PJ Rangers was put in Group B for the 2017 Malaysia FAM League with seven other clubs. The club was knocked out from the 2017 Malaysia FA Cup in the second round after a 2–1 defeat by UiTM. At the end of the season, PJ Rangers finished second in the league's Group B and were defeated by Shahzan Muda FC 3–1 in the quarter-finals of the knock out stage.

In the 2018 Malaysia FAM Cup season, the team again achieved second place in Group B, and qualified for the knock-out stage. PJ Rangers failed again at the penultimate stage, when they were defeated 4–3 on aggregate to Selangor United in the semi-finals. At the end of the season, the team's management announced on social media that they would not participate in the next FAM Cup season, instead rejoining the Selangor Super League state league beginning in 2019.

Stadium

PJ Rangers home stadium is the Petaling Jaya Stadium in Petaling Jaya, Selangor. The capacity of the stadium is 25,000.

The club has previously played in various stadiums before moving to Petaling Jaya Stadium for the 2017 season. Early in their first season in FAM League, the club played in MPSJ Stadium, Subang Jaya before moving to UPM Mini Stadium, Serdang for the remainder of the season. For the second season in FAM League, the club once again moved to a different stadium, the Shah Alam Stadium in Shah Alam, Selangor where they played for the whole 2016 season.

The club has planned to build a permanent stadium owned by them in near future as part of club expansion plan. It will be located in Petaling Jaya.

Crest and colours

Crest
The original crest, adopted when the club was founded in 2011 features the logo of AirAsia as the main theme with the Allstars suffix.

Despite the club being founded in 2011, the words "EST 2001" featured on the crest. This was reference to the establishment of the AirAsia low-cost carrier company after Tune Air, led by Tony Fernandes, bought AirAsia from a Malaysian government-owned company in September 2001. The crest was replaced with a new design to reflect the club's  rebranding where the club adopted a colour theme of maroon and gold which was first used for the 2017 season.

Kit colours
Home Kit: Red and white shirts as it is an iconic colour for the club.

Away Kit: Usually blue and white or various combination colours such as black.

Supporters
As part of the rebranding effort, the club changed its name to Petaling Jaya Rangers with the emphasis on engaging the Petaling Jaya community for local area support. , Petaling Jaya had a population of 619,925 which the club intended to engage via community programs.

The club are established a youth football academy for the club with the support from QPR which was a landmark project among the local community.

Ownership and finances
The club was founded in 2011 and owned by the AirAsia Group, a Malaysian low-cost airline headquartered in Sepang, Malaysia which is spearhead by Tony Fernandes who is also the chairman of Queens Park Rangers. As part of ownership, the company provides all necessary budget and sponsorship for the club. The management is keen to move the club to be near their headquarters but the main focus is engaging with local community in Petaling Jaya to create a club with a local community support.

The club also owns an amateur feeder team which is primarily made up of AirAsia staff.

The club aims to be a sustainable self-funding football club in near future and reduce its dependency on AirAsia via financial funding through other methods of corporate sponsorship, gate receipt, and merchandise.

Sponsorship
In 2016 The PJ Rangers kit was supplied by Line 7.

The club shirt sponsor has always been AirAsia as part of ownership deal. The club also has had other shared shirt sponsors as they has been previously sponsored by GE Aviation in 2015 season.

Season by season record

Players

Current squad

Transfers
For recent transfers, see List of Malaysian football transfers 2018 and List of Malaysian football transfers 2017

Head coaches

Management
Updated 7 December 2016.

Current coaching staff
Updated 7 March 2019.

See also
 Queen's Park Rangers

References

External links 

 Official Website

 
Malaysia FAM League clubs
Football clubs in Malaysia
2011 establishments in Malaysia
Petaling Jaya
Sport in Selangor